is a town located in Rumoi Subprefecture, Hokkaido, Japan. It is typical of the small coastal towns that line the western coast of Hokkaido.

Demographics
As of September 2016, the town has an estimated population of 3,261 and a density of 7.2 persons per km2. The total area is 454.50 km2.

Tourism
Tomamae is famous for its windmills which dot the countryside. It is also famous for its brown bear. In 1915, a huge bear attacked the village and killed 7 people. The Bear Museum, just off route 232 has many interesting exhibits and a 40-minute film reconstructing the attack.

The town festival is at the beginning of July, and at the end of February they have a kite competition and festival (though it is usually very cold).

Mascot

He is a 7-year-old brown bear cub. He wears a hat that has two badges (a windmill badge and a badge dedciated to agricultural and seafood products).

See also 
Sankebetsu brown bear incident

References

External links

Official Website 

Towns in Hokkaido